George Kenneth Smith CBE (born 2 June 1929) is a former Scottish international rugby player. He played at Flanker. He became the 108th President of the Scottish Rugby Union.

Rugby Union career

Amateur career
Smith was educated at George Watson's College and played club rugby for both Watsonians and Kelso.

Provincial career
Smith played for South of Scotland District in the 1956–57 Scottish Inter-District Championship and 1957–58 Scottish Inter-District Championship.

International career
Smith was capped eighteen times for Scotland between 1957 and 1961.

Smith also took part in the 1959 British Lions tour to Australia and New Zealand, playing in four tests, two against Australia and two against New Zealand.

Administrative career
Smith moved into the Scottish Rugby Union (SRU) administration after being Tour Manager for Scotland's tour to New Zealand in 1981. He was both Chairman of the IRB (now World Rugby) and President of the SRU.

While President of the SRU, in 1995, he was appointed a CBE for his contribution to the sport of rugby.

References

1929 births
Living people
Rugby union players from Edinburgh
Scotland international rugby union players
British & Irish Lions rugby union players from Scotland
Scottish rugby union players
Commanders of the Order of the British Empire
Presidents of the Scottish Rugby Union
Kelso RFC players
Watsonians RFC players
South of Scotland District (rugby union) players
Rugby union flankers